This is a list of non-American heads of state who have received their undergraduate or postgraduate education from American colleges and universities.

Notes

United States
Educated